Losevo is a rural locality (a selo) and the administrative center of Losevskoye Rural Settlement, Semiluksky District, Voronezh Oblast, Russia. The population was 531 as of 2010. There are 8 streets.

Geography 
Losevo is located on the left bank of the Veduga River, 25 km northwest of Semiluki (the district's administrative centre) by road. Voznesenka is the nearest rural locality.

References 

Rural localities in Semiluksky District